This is a list of people awarded the title Hero of the Soviet Union of Bashkir ethnicity. It does not include non-Bashkir residents of Bashkortostan who were awarded the title.

 Minnetdin Aminov ru
 Gafiatulla Araslanov ru
 Gayfutdin Askin ru
 Mikhail Akhmedov ru
 Gabit Akhmedov ru
 Khakimyan Akhmetgalin ru
 Yayum Akhmetshin ru
 Gayz Baimurzin ru
 Galey Berdin ru
 Sultan Bikeyev ru
 Salman Biktimirov ru
 Khudat Bulatov ru
 Mirgay Farkhutdinov ru
 Khasan Gaisin ru
 Abdrakhman Gaifullin ru
 Musa Gareyev (twice)
 Shakir Gatiatullin 
 Abdrauf Davletov ru
 Gatiyat Ishkulov ru
 Kutluakhmet Khaibullin ru
 Amir Khaidarov ru
 Timerbulat Khalikov ru
 Safa Khasanov ru
 Murat Kuzhakov ru
 Tagir Kusimov
 Kuddus Latipov ru
 Gumer Minnibayev ru
 Taftizan Minnigulov ru
 Gazis Murzagalimov ru
 Gabdulkhai Saitov ru
 Gimai Shaikhutdinov ru
 Fattakh Shamgulov ru
 Sharif Suleymanov ru
 Bary Sultanov ru
 Zhavdat Sunagatullin ru
 Sufy Sufyanov ru
 Mullayar Syrtlanov ru
 Zubai Utyagulov
 Shagy Yamaletdinov ru

References 

 
 Russian Ministry of Defence Database «Подвиг Народа в Великой Отечественной войне 1941—1945 гг.» [Feat of the People in the Great Patriotic War 1941-1945] (in Russian).

Heroes of the Soviet Union lists